This is a list of  ambassadors of Iceland.

Current ambassadors

Permanent representatives to international organisations

Ambassadors to past countries
Czechoslovakia
East Germany (German Democratic Republic)
Serbia and Montenegro
Soviet Union
Yugoslavia

See also
Ambassadors to Iceland

 

Iceland